Pescatori is an Italian surname. Notable people with the surname include:

Christian Pescatori (born 1971), Italian racing driver
Laura Pescatori (fl. 1736), favorite of the Spanish queen Elisabeth Farnese
Max Pescatori (born 1971), Italian poker player

Italian-language surnames